Aurora Society was a secret society and a national Finnish literary society at the Royal Academy of Turku from 1770 to 1779. The Society consisted of many prominent members of the Finnish cultural sphere and had as its focal points poetry, Finnish history, geography and the research of language and economy.

The Society published Finland's first newspaper, Åbo Tidningar (Tidningar Utgifne Af et Sällskap i Åbo), between the years 1771 to 1778, and 1782 to 1785.

Furthermore, the first public orchestra concerts in Finland were also organized by the Aurora Society.

The society was a typical product of the Enlightenment period: a secret society on one hand and a cultural and educational organization on the other.

Members 

Henrik Gabriel Porthan
Johan Lilius 
Abraham Niklas Edelcrantz
Matthias Calonius
Carl Fredrik Fredenheim
Magnus Jacob Alopaeus

See also 

 Secret society

References 
Media moves,thisisFINLAND
Musical life in Finland in the 17th and 18th centuries, http://www.fimic.fi/fimic/fimic.nsf/mainframe?readform&B3DDE16ED09DFD88C22567F40043EAE9
Henrik Gabriel Porthan, http://www.finnica.fi/centralfinland/whatislike/porthanesittely.htm
 :fi:Aurora-seura
Article in kansallisbiografia, https://web.archive.org/web/20080509051529/http://artikkelihaku.kansallisbiografia.fi/artikkeli/2599/
A concise history of Finland By D. G. Kirby, 
A History of Finland's Literature By George C. Schoolfield,

Notes 

Secret societies in Finland
Finnish writers' organisations
Finnish culture
18th century in Turku